The Gabala FC 2006-07 season was Gabala FC's first Azerbaijan Premier League season, and their first season under manager Ramiz Mammadov. They finished the season in 11th place, whilst they also took part in the 2006–07 Azerbaijan Cup, which they were knocked out of in at the Last 16 stage by Baku.

Squad

Transfers

In

Out

Competitions

Top League

Results summary

Results by round

Results

Table

Azerbaijan Cup

Squad statistics

Appearances and goals

|-
|colspan="14"|Players who appeared for Gabala no longer at the club:

|}

Goal Scorers

References
FK Gäncä was excluded from the league.
Qarabağ have played their home games at the Tofiq Bahramov Stadium since 1993 due to the ongoing situation in Quzanlı.

External links 
Gabala FC Website
Gabala FC at UEFA.com

Gabala FC seasons
Gabala